Lady Lara, is a motor yacht built in 2015 by Lürssen in Schacht-Audorf. She is owned by Israeli/Kazakh billionaire Alexander Mashkevitch.

Design
Lady Lara'''s exterior and interior were designed by Reymond Langton Design Ltd. The hull is built of steel and the superstructure is made of aluminium, with teak laid decks. The yacht is Lloyd's registered, issued by Cayman Islands.

Amenities

The yacht includes zero speed stabilizers, an elevator, beach club, helicopter landing pad on the bow, and spa. It also has a swimming platform, tender garage with tender, air conditioning, on deck jacuzzi, gym, and underwater lights.

See also
 Luxury yacht
 List of motor yachts by length List of yachts built by Lürssen''

References 

2015 ships
Motor yachts